Community Coach is a bus operator in northern New Jersey owned by Coach USA, operating fixed route and charter service.

Routes

Directly controlled
Community Coach, as Community Transit Lines, operates a single line run from the Port Authority Bus Terminal in New York City to the Livingston Mall in Livingston, the #77 line, via Main Street in Orange, Route 10, and Ridgedale Avenue, seven days a week. This line was previously operated by DeCamp.

Under contract (NJT)

Under contract to New Jersey Transit, Community Coach, operating as Community Transportation, operates the following routes under contract, which run Monday through Saturday only unless otherwise indicated.

Passaic County local routes

References

External links
Community Coach

Surface transportation in Greater New York
Stagecoach Group bus operators in the United States and Canada
Intercity bus companies of the United States
Bus transportation in New Jersey
Transportation in Bergen County, New Jersey
Transportation in Essex County, New Jersey
Transportation in Passaic County, New Jersey
Transportation companies based in New Jersey